The Sinn is a river that flows through the state of Hesse and the Bavarian province of Lower Franconia in southern Germany.

Course 
The Sinn emerges in the Franconian Rhön at the foot of the Kreuzberg near the local subdistrict (Gemarkung) of Neuwildflecken. At Zeitlofs on the Hessian-Lower Franconian border it flows into the Schmale Sinn which joins it from the Dammersfeldkuppe to the northeast.

Accompanied in places by the Würzburg−Fulda railway and crossed by the A 7 motorway bridge below Riedenberg, the Sinn initially flows in a southwesterly and then in a southerly direction to Gemünden, where it joins the Franconian Saale just under 700 m before the latter river discharges into the River Main.

Tributaries 
The tributaries of the Sinn include (in downstream order): Oberbach, Schmale Sinn, Gronau, Jossa and Aura.

Towns and villages 
The towns and villages along the Sinn and Schmale Sinn include (in downstream order):

Sinn 
Wildflecken, Oberbach, Riedenberg, Bad Brückenau, Eckarts-Rupboden, Zeitlofs, Altengronau, Jossa, Obersinn, Mittelsinn, Burgsinn, Rieneck, Schaippach, Gemünden, (Oberzell).

Schmale Sinn 
Kothen, Speicherz, the A 7 Grenzwald Bridge, Oberzell, Weichersbach, Mottgers

Nature 
The existence of the extremely rare snake's head fritillary in the Sinn Valley has been recorded since the 19th century. This plant occurs at heights between 160 and 250 metres in various meadow communities, especially in the wet meadows of the two nature reserves that border one another: the Sinngrund near Obersinn and Sinnwiesen von Altengronau.

References 

Rivers of Bavaria
Rivers of Hesse
Rhön Mountains
Rivers of Germany